MFC 18: Famous was a mixed martial arts event held by the Maximum Fighting Championship (MFC) on September 26, 2008 in Enoch, Alberta.

Background

It was announced that the winner of the David Heath and Emanuel Newton fight would receive a title shot against MFC Light Heavyweight Champion Roger Hollett. Also, the winner of the Ryan Ford and LaVerne Clark fight would receive a title shot against MFC Welterweight Champion Pat Healy.

Fight Card

See also 
 Maximum Fighting Championship
 List of Maximum Fighting Championship events
 2008 in Maximum Fighting Championship

References

18
2008 in mixed martial arts
Mixed martial arts in Canada
Sport in Alberta
2008 in Canadian sports
2008 in Alberta